Latagognoma is a genus of snout moths. It was described by Tams in 1935, and contains the species L. dacryodes. It is known from Samoa.

References

Pyralinae
Monotypic moth genera
Moths of Oceania
Pyralidae genera